Come Around Sundown is the fifth studio album by American rock band Kings of Leon, released in Ireland, Australia and Germany on October 15, 2010, followed by releases in the United Kingdom on October 18 and North America on October 19. The official album covers and track list were revealed on September 3. The lead single, "Radioactive", along with its accompanying music video, premiered on September 8, on the Kings' official website. The following day, it received its official radio premiere on Australian radio.

The album debuted at number one in Australia, Austria, Belgium (Flanders), Canada, Germany, Ireland, Switzerland and the United Kingdom. In the UK, the album sold 183,000 units in its first week as well as breaking the record for biggest first week digital album sales by selling over 49,000 album downloads. It was the 11th biggest selling album of 2010 in the UK with 694,300 sales. On November 30, 2011, the album received a nomination at the 54th Grammy Awards for Best Rock Album.

Reception

Come Around Sundown has received generally positive reviews from critics. Sampling 27 reviews, the review aggregator website Metacritic gave the album a weighted average of 64/100. Rolling Stone magazine placed Come Around Sundown at #18 on their list of the Best Albums of 2010. Q Magazine also placed the album at #25 on their lists of the 50 Best Albums of 2010. It its first week, the album sold 183,000 copies (October 2010).

Track listing

Personnel
Adapted from the booklet of Come Around Sundown.

Kings of Leon
 Caleb Followill – lead and backing vocals, rhythm and acoustic guitar
 Matthew Followill – lead guitar, synthesiser, piano, Wurlitzer, lap steel, backing vocals
 Jared Followill – bass, synthesiser, piano, percussion, xylophone, Omnichord, backing vocals on "Mary"
 Nathan Followill – drums, percussion, backing vocals

Additional personnel
 Jacquire King – production, percussion, backing vocals
 Angelo Petraglia – production, B3 organ, wurlitzer
 Liam O'Neil – B3 organ, baritone and tenor sax, synthesiser, piano
 Robert Mallory – fiddle
 Krish Lingala – saxophone, synthesiser, theremin
 Chris Coleman – trumpet, backing vocals
 Mike Kezner – sitar, maracas
 Ken Levitan & Andy Mendelsohn for Vector – management
 Scott Clayton, CAA (USA) & Peter Nash (Rest of World) – booking

Charts and certifications

Weekly charts

Year-end charts

Decade-end charts

Certifications

See also
List of European number-one hits of 2010
List of number-one hits of 2010 (Germany)
List of number-one albums of 2010 (Ireland)
List of number-one albums from the 2010s (Scotland)
List of number-one albums from the 2010s (UK)

References

2010 albums
Kings of Leon albums
RCA Records albums
Albums produced by Jacquire King